USS LST-75 was a  in the United States Navy during World War II. She was transferred to the Philippine Navy as RPS Cotabato (T-36).

Construction and career 
LST-75 was laid down on 30 January 1943 at Jeffersonville Boat & Machine Co., Jeffersonville, Indiana. Launched on 7 April 1943 and commissioned on 21 June 1943.

Service in the United States Navy 
During World War II, LST-75 was assigned to the Europe-Africa-Middle theater. She then participated in the Invasion of Normandy from 6 to 25 June 1944.

She participated in the invasion of Okinawa and later took occupation there from 26 to 30 June 1945. She assigned to Occupation service in the Far East from 19 November to 11 December 1945 and 5 July to 2 August 1947.

She was decommissioned on 22 December 1947.

LST-75 was struck from the Navy Register on 22 January 1948 and transferred to the Philippines.

Service in the Philippine Navy 
She was acquired by the Philippine Navy on 22 January 1948 and renamed RPS Cotabato (T-36).

During the Korean War, RPS Cotabato (T-36), RPS Pampanga (T-37), RPS Bulacan (T-38), BRP Albay (T-39), and RPS Misamis Oriental (T-40) had been sent to transport Filipino soldiers to and from Korea for five years.

In September 1951 both Cotabato and Pampanga under CDR Tomas C. Robenul, PN would again undertake the task of bringing the second Filipino battalion the 20th BCT under Col. Salvador Abcede to the Korean theater of operations.

On 23 October 1951, Cotabato escorted by a pair of submarine chasers entered Manila Bay with a tumultuous welcome from surrounding ships, a flyby from a formation of P-51 Mustangs of the PAF, and a jubilant crowd.

Cotabato and Pampanga were decommissioned in early 1978.

Awards 
LST-75 have earned the following awards:

American Campaign Medal
Combat Action Ribbon
European-Africa-Middle East Campaign Medal (1 battle star)
Asiatic-Pacific Campaign Medal 
Navy Occupation Medal (with Asia clasp)
World War II Victory Medal

Citations

Sources 
 
 
 
 

World War II amphibious warfare vessels of the United States
Ships built in Jeffersonville, Indiana
Korean War amphibious warfare vessels of the Philippines
1943 ships
LST-1-class tank landing ships of the United States Navy
LST-1-class tank landing ships of the Philippine Navy